Pecorara is a town and former comune (municipality) in the Province of Piacenza in the Italian region Emilia-Romagna, located about  northwest of Bologna and about  southwest of Piacenza. Since 2018, it has been a frazione of the comune of Alta Val Tidone.

 

Cities and towns in Emilia-Romagna